Anasphaltis is a genus of moths in the family Gelechiidae.

Species
Anasphaltis renigerellus (Zeller, 1839)

References

Dichomeridinae
Taxa named by Edward Meyrick
Monotypic moth genera